The North Karelia Central Hospital is a hospital located in the city of Joensuu in North Karelia, Finland. It was built in 1953, which makes it the oldest central hospital in the whole country. The hospital is located near the city center of Joensuu on the top of Niinivaara, from where its white main building can be seen tens of kilometers all the way to Koli. The height of the 12-storey building is 45 meters. Architects Jussi Paatela together with Olli Pöyry and Marja Pöyry were responsible for the design of the hospital buildings.

In North Karelia, the hospital provides special medical services in a total of 166,400 inhabitants in 13 municipalities. The hospital also has a helipad  for patient transport.

The North Karelia Hospital District is under the special responsibility of Kuopio University Hospital. Part of the specialist care is provided in the area of special responsibility at the university hospital in the area. The North Karelia Central Hospital does not have open heart surgery and neurosurgery; by decree of the Finnish Government, for example, organ transplants are centralized throughout the country at Helsinki University Central Hospital and hyperbaric oxygen treatment at Turku University Hospital.

The hospital serves as a teaching hospital for social and health care and medical students.

Further reading 
 Harri Mustaniemi: Rautainen operatsionipöytä, Pohjois-Karjalan sairaanhoidon historiikki. Joensuu, 1996. (in Finnish)
 Helena Hirvonen: Tikkamäki - terveyden temppeli, Pohjois-Karjalan keskussairaalan historia 1953-2016.  ISBN 978-952-9793-79-2. (in Finnish)

References

External links 

 Siun sote - Official Site of the North Karelia Central Hospital
 North Karelia Central Hospital - Suomi.fi
 Pohjois-Karjalan keskussairaala - Joensuun kartta (in Finnish)

Hospitals established in 1953
1953 establishments in Finland
Buildings and structures in North Karelia
Joensuu
Hospitals in Finland